The Asian Canoe Confederation (ACC) is the continental governing body of the sport of canoeing in Asia.

Events 
 Asian Canoeing Championships
 Canoeing at the Asian Games

See also
 International Canoe Federation

References

External links 
 Facebook page

Canoeing governing bodies
Sports governing bodies in Asia